Alexander Duff, 3rd Earl of Fife (18 April 1731 – 17 April 1811) was a Scottish nobleman.

Duff was the son of William Duff, 1st Earl of Fife and younger brother of James Duff, 2nd Earl of Fife.

He married Mary Skene, daughter of George Skene, 18th of Skene.

He briefly held the title Earl of Fife, and was succeeded by his elder son, James Duff, 4th Earl of Fife. His younger son was General Hon. Alexander Duff.  In addition to the title of Earl of Fife, he succeeded as the 3rd Viscount MacDuff, and the 2nd Baron of MacDuff.

He died at Duff House, Banff.

References

1731 births
1811 deaths
Earls Fife